Denis Nesci (born 25 July 1981) is an Italian politician who has been serving as a Member of the European Parliament for the Brothers of Italy since 2022.

References

See also 

 List of members of the European Parliament for Italy, 2019–2024

Living people
1981 births
21st-century Italian politicians
MEPs for Italy 2019–2024
Brothers of Italy MEPs